Journey to Utopia is the second solo album by former Mantronix member Kurtis Mantronik. The album was released in 2014 on the Street DNA label

Track listing

"Got to Have You" (Khaleel) - 5:08
"Need Your Love" (Khaleel) - 4:26
"Another Dirty Love Song" (Khaleel) - 3:56
"So Many Times (I Thought OK)" (Khaleel) - 4:21
"(Got to Be) Free (Remix)" (Khaleel) - 3:50
"Good Woman (Jerome Price Remix)" (Barbara Lynn) - 5:40
"2:00am (I'm So Fucked)" (Khaleel) - 4:25
"Deeper" (Khaleel) - 3:42
"DJ Mix" (Continuous Album Remix of Tracks 1–8) (Khaleel) - 30:29
"Good Woman (Tony Tokyo Mix) - 1:53 (Bonus Track, CD release only) (Lynn) - 7:20

References

External links

2014 albums
Kurtis Mantronik albums
Albums produced by Kurtis Mantronik